Adoratsky (masculine) or Adoratskaya (feminine) is a Russian last name. It was artificially created from the Latin word meaning respected, revered and was used in Russian Orthodox seminaries.

People with the last name
Varya Adoratskaya, subject of a painting by Nicolai Fechin, Russian–American painter
Vladimir Adoratsky (1878–1945), Soviet communist historian and political theorist

References

Notes

Sources
Ю. А. Федосюк (Yu. A. Fedosyuk). "Русские фамилии: популярный этимологический словарь" (Russian Last Names: a Popular Etymological Dictionary). Москва, 2006. 



Russian-language surnames